Hulkuru or Guttahalli is a small village in the Kolar Gold Fields Taluk of Kolar district in Karnataka, India. It is situated about 15 kilometers from Kolar Gold Fields.

Hulkuru is famous for the Lakshmi Venkateshwara temple. This place is also called as Bangaru Tirupati. The western part of Venkatapura became Guttahalli.  Bangaru Tirupati was modeled after the famous Venkateshwara Temple of Tirupati in Andhra Pradesh.

Education
Government First Grade College was started on 23-Jul-2007 as per the orders of honorable Government of Karnataka. During first year it  made its humble beginning in ‘Gandhi Seva Grama’ building with 31 students and two programmes. Namely BA (HES) & BBM. Five years later, strength increased moderately to 328 students with two additional programmes namely BA (HEP) and B.COM.

Bangaru Thirupathi which is popularly known as Guttahalli is located in Hulkuru village, Kolar district and it is 100 KM away from state capital, Bengaluru. It is a holy pilgrimage with Lord Venkateshwara shrine which attracts thousands of people during the holy Shravanamasa and during its Jathra festival. It is a place known for its tranquility and it is free from all urban disturbances providing natural environment for the students to learn.

GFGC Bangaru Thirupathi is affiliated to Bangalore North University and presently it is offering Arts, Commerce and Management Programs. Classes are being conducted in two different buildings for short of accommodation. For the construction of new building revenue department has sanctioned 3 acres of land to the college and on which five temporary class rooms is being constructed from grants given by Dept. of collegiate Education. Another 2 crore rupees grant is being sanctioned by the honourable government of Karnataka for the construction of a permanent structure.

Despite the rural background and economic deprivation, the students are performing very well academically. Results are good. Even in sports and cultural activities they have shown their excellent talents and participated in district and inter-collegiate tournaments. College also conducts several indoor and outdoor games and the victorious are rewarded with suitable prizes. During 2011-12 our student’s participated inter-collegiate cultural competition held at different places and won medals for their excellent performance.

Library has good collection of books with different titles to cater the needs of both students and staff. Leading dailies and journals are displayed in reading room for the benefit of students and staff.

Demographics 
According to the 2011 Indian Census, the town consists of 536 people. The town has a literacy rate of 62.12 percent which is lower than Karnataka's average of 75.36 percent.

Gallery

References

Villages in Kolar district